Salome of the Tenements is a novel published in 1922 by Jewish-American writer Anzia Yezierska. The novel follows the story of a young Jewish immigrant living in New York who wishes to marry a wealthy man and escape the bounds of her lower-class upbringing. Yezierska drew inspiration for the novel from the lives of Rose Pastor Stokes and her husband J. G. Phelps Stokes, as well as her own relationship with John Dewey. The novel was published by Boni & Liveright, and it was adapted into a film of the same name in 1925.

Synopsis 
The novel's main character, Sonya Vrunsky, is the daughter of Russian-Jewish immigrants living in the Lower East Side of Manhattan. At the beginning of the novel, Sonya is working as a journalist at a local Jewish newspaper, however she yearns to escape the lower-class world of the immigrant community. She sets her sights on marrying a wealthy, Christian man, named John Manning, who lives in the much wealthier and upper-class Upper East Side of Manhattan. Sonya uses her ethnic background as a Russian Jew to portray herself as exotic and exciting, which ends up being, as she had hoped, appealing to John. Eventually, Sonya and John become married. Once married, however, Sonya soon realizes that the kind of life that she had desires for so long is not what she initially thought it would be like. Sonya leaves John, and by the end of the novel, Sonya has found a successful career as a fashion designer and has married a fellow designer whom she truly loves.

Reception 
When first published, Salome of the Tenements received a wide variety of reviews. Some praised Yezierska's writing style and admired how the novel depicted immigrant communities that were often under-represented in literature. On the other hand, many critics found Sonya's attempt to pull herself up out of poverty by marrying a rich man to be both shocking and off-putting.

References 

Novels by Anzia Yezierska
1922 American novels
Boni & Liveright books